The Peru national basketball team is administrated by the Peru Basketball Federation (Spanish: Federación Deportiva Peruana de Basketball) (F.D.P.B.).

Peru joined the International Federation of Basketball (FIBA) in 1936 and has one of the world's longest basketball traditions. 
Its best result to date was 7th place at the 1950 FIBA World Cup.

Until the mid-70s, Team Peru was one of South America's major basketball forces. It was the second best South American contender at the 1936 Summer Olympics. At the 1964 Summer Olympics, Peru was the only contender that kept the dominant United States to only 60 points. Between 1950 and 1967, Peru qualified for four out of five Basketball World Cups. From 1963 to 1973, it finished in the Top Four at the South American Basketball Championship at six straight events. However, after 1973, the team went through a steep decline. The team won its last victory at the South American Basketball Championship on 22 July 2001, when Peru beat Ecuador 72–58.

Competitive record

Olympic Games

FIBA World Cup

FIBA AmeriCup
yet to qualify

Pan American Games

1951–59 : Did not qualify
 1963: 5th
 1967: 8th
 1971: 9th
1975–2019 : Did not qualify
2023 : To be determined

South American Basketball Championship

Current roster
At the 2018 South American Games:

Depth chart

Head coach position
 Gustavo De Benedetti
 Carlos Zanelatto – 2016

Past rosters
Scroll down to see more.
1936 Olympic Games: finished 8th among 21 teams

Miguel Godoy, Luis Jacob, Roberto Rospigliosi, Koko Cárdenas, Fernando Ruiz, "Canon" Ore, Jose Carlos Godoy, Armando Rossi, Rolando Bacigalupo, Manuel Fiestas, Willy Dasso, Antuco Flecha (Coach: Pedro Vera)

1948 Olympic Games: finished 10th among 23 teams

Eduardo Fiestas, Carlos Alegre, Rodolfo Salas, David Descalzo, Luis Sánchez, Soracco Ríos, José Vizcarra, Alberto Fernández, Ahrens Valdivia, Virgilio Drago, Ferreyros Pérez

1950 World Championship: finished 7th among 10 teams

Eduardo Fiestas, Carlos Alegre, David Descalzo, Alberto Fernández, Luis Gardella, Rodolfo Salas, Luis Vergara, Francisco de Zela, Virgilio Drago, Guillermo Airaldi, Mario Castro, Ernesto Ortiz (Coach: Carlos Rojas y Rojas)

1954 World Championship: finished 12th among 12 teams

Eduardo Fiestas, Hernán Sánchez, José Vizcarra, Virgilio Drago, Jorge Ferreyros, Isaac Loveday, Amalfi Lucioni, José Chocano, Rodolfo Salas, Álvaro Castro, Guillermo Toro, Aurelio Moreyra, Víctor Obando (Coach: Luis Alberto Sánchez)

1963 World Championship: finished 12th among 13 teams

Ricardo Duarte, Luis Gusmán, Jorge Vargas, Oscar Benalcazar, Fernando Claudet, Antonio Sangio, Ernesto Podestá, Enrique Duarte, Oscar Sevilla, Francisco Saldarriaga, Tomás Sangio, Raúl Duarte (Coach: Guillermo Ross / James McGregor)

1964 Olympic Games: finished 15th among 16 teams

Ricardo Duarte, Jorge Vargas, Oscar Benalcazar, Simón Paredes, Enrique Duarte, José Gusmán, Tomás Sangio, Carlos Vásquez, Raúl Duarte, Oscar Sevilla, Manuel Valerio, Luis Duarte (Coach: Fernando Cordova)

1967 World Championship: finished 10th among 13 teams

Ricardo Duarte, Jorge Vargas, Oscar Sevilla, Manuel Vigo, Tomás Sangio, César Vittorelli, José Verano, Manuel Valerio, Raúl Duarte, Walter Fleming, Simón Paredes, Carlos Vásquez (Coach: Carlos Alegre Benavides)

2008 Squad:
According to Federacion Deportiva Peruana de Basketball

At the 2016 South American Basketball Championship:

Kit

Manufacturer
2016: Peak

See also
Peru national under-19 basketball team
Peru national under-17 basketball team
Peru women's national basketball team
Peru national 3x3 team

References

External links
Latinbasket.com - Peru Men National Team 
Federacion Deportiva Peruana de Basketball 
Peru Basketball Records at FIBA Archive

Men's national basketball teams
Basketball
National team
Basketball teams in Peru
1936 establishments in Peru